Shwegyin may refer to:

Shwegyin (town) in Bago Region, Myanmar
Shwegyin, Banmauk, Myanmar
Shwegyin, Kalewa, Myanmar
Shwegyin Nikaya, a Buddhist order of monks